The FINA Diving World Series is a diving competition series held annually since 2007.

This series is held around the world (the current series includes 4 events) where the divers collect points depending on their results to determine the World Series champions.
This series is reserved for only the best divers in the World and national wild cards. Most of the divers are medallists from previous Olympics, World Championships and World Cups.

List of FINA Diving World Series

Overall ranking
Overall ranking is based on the combined results from the legs of the series. Divers earned points based on placement at each competition. For individual events, points were counted separately for each person. For synchronized events, points were combined for each country – some countries had different pairs compete at the different legs of the series. Medals were not awarded for overall ranking, but top divers (or countries for synchro) who competed in all the legs earned prize money.

2007

Men's events

Women's events

2008

Men's events

Women's events

2009

Men's events

Women's events

2010
Men's events

Women's events

2011

Men's events

Women's events

2012

Men's events

Women's events

2013

Men's events

Women's events

2014

Men's events

Women's events

2015

Men's events

Women's events

Mixed events

2016

Men's events

Women's events

Mixed events

2017

Men's events

Women's events

Mixed events

2018

Men's events

Women's events

Mixed events

2019

Men's events

Women's events

Mixed events

2020

See also 
 FINA Diving Grand Prix (https://fr.wikipedia.org/wiki/Grand_Prix_FINA_de_plongeon)
 FINA Diving World Cup 
 World Diving Championships
 FINA World Junior Diving Championships

References

Works cited

External links
 FINA World Diving Series official mini-site

 
International diving competitions
Recurring sporting events established in 2007
Sports competition series